Lowry Crossing is a city in Collin County, Texas, United States. The population was 1,711 at the 2010 census.

Geography

Demographics

At the 2000 census there were 1,229 people, 441 households, and 362 families living in the city. The population density was 440.8 people per square mile (170.1/km2). There were 456 housing units at an average density of 163.5/sq mi (63.1/km2).  The racial makeup of the city was 93.98% White, 0.65% African American, 0.41% Native American, 0.73% Asian, 3.66% from other races, and 0.57% from two or more races. Hispanic or Latino of any race were 6.43%.

Of the 441 households 43.1% had children under the age of 18 living with them, 71.4% were married couples living together, 7.0% had a female householder with no husband present, and 17.7% were non-families. 14.3% of households were one person and 2.3% were one person aged 65 or older. The average household size was 2.79 and the average family size was 3.08.

The age distribution was 28.4% under the age of 18, 5.9% from 18 to 24, 36.1% from 25 to 44, 24.2% from 45 to 64, and 5.5% 65 or older. The median age was 35 years. For every 100 females, there were 105.2 males. For every 100 females age 18 and over, there were 105.6 males.

The median household income was $67,222 and the median family income  was $73,393. Males had a median income of $50,066 versus $31,563 for females. The per capita income for the city was $26,574. About 1.2% of families and 3.0% of the population were below the poverty line, including 2.9% of those under age 18 and 2.2% of those age 65 or over.

References

Dallas–Fort Worth metroplex
Cities in Texas
Cities in Collin County, Texas